Winston Kinnard Garland (born December 19, 1964) is an American former professional basketball player at the point guard position. He played collegiately at the Southeastern Community College (Iowa) for two seasons (1983–84 and 1984–85), and then at the Missouri State University for the two following seasons. He was selected by the Milwaukee Bucks in the second round (40th pick overall) of the 1987 NBA draft. Garland played eight professional seasons, 7 of which were in the NBA, where he played for 5 different teams – Golden State Warriors (1987 to 1990), Los Angeles Clippers (1990–91), Denver Nuggets (1991–92), Houston Rockets (1992–93) and Minnesota Timberwolves (1994–95).

In his NBA career, Garland played in 511 games and scored a total of 4,799 points. His best year as a professional came during the 1988–89 season as a member of the Warriors, appearing in 79 games and averaging 14.5 ppg. In his rookie campaign, Garland was the first Warrior to record a triple double in five years.

He played one year professionally in Italy, for Benetton Treviso (1993–94, won the Italian Cup). He attended and played for Roosevelt High School, the same school that produced NBA players Dick Barnett and Glenn Robinson. In his junior year, Garland lost the 1982 Indiana State Championship in the last seconds to Plymouth High School, which was led by Scott Skiles, who would go on to play in the NBA. In 2007, he was inducted into the Indiana High School Basketball Hall of Fame Silver Anniversary Team. Following his playing career, Garland was the head boys' basketball coach at Gary West Side High School in Gary, Indiana from 2009 to 2012.

Garland is the father of Cleveland Cavaliers player Darius Garland.

References

1964 births
Living people
20th-century African-American sportspeople
21st-century African-American people
African-American basketball players
American expatriate basketball people in Italy
American men's basketball players
Basketball players from Gary, Indiana
Denver Nuggets players
Golden State Warriors players
High school basketball coaches in Indiana
Houston Rockets players
Los Angeles Clippers players
Milwaukee Bucks draft picks
Minnesota Timberwolves players
Missouri State Bears basketball players
Pallacanestro Treviso players
Point guards
Southeastern Blackhawks men's basketball players